Frank Paul Vogel (born June 21, 1973) is an American professional basketball coach. He previously served as the head coach for the Los Angeles Lakers, Orlando Magic and Indiana Pacers of the National Basketball Association (NBA). Vogel also previously served as an assistant coach of the Pacers, Philadelphia 76ers and Boston Celtics. He coached the Lakers to an NBA championship in 2020.

Early years
Vogel grew up in Wildwood Crest, New Jersey. During his eighth grade year, he was featured in an episode of Late Night with David Letterman during the Stupid Human Tricks segment, in which he spun a basketball on a toothbrush while brushing his teeth.

On December 10, 1990, Vogel's childhood home caught fire and everything in the house was destroyed. Vogel, who was 17 years old at the time, and his mother—the only two people in the house at the time—escaped out of a window.

Vogel graduated from Wildwood High School in 1991.

At Juniata College in Huntingdon, Pennsylvania, Vogel was a starter for the Division III basketball team.

In 1994, Vogel transferred to the University of Kentucky. Vogel served as the student manager for the Kentucky Wildcats men's team under head coach Rick Pitino in the 1994–95 season. The following season, Pitino resurrected the school's junior varsity team, and Vogel played for them. Vogel graduated from Kentucky with a B.S. in biology in 1998.

Coaching career

Boston Celtics (2001–2004) 
Vogel began his career as the head video coordinator for the Boston Celtics under head coach Rick Pitino. He retained that position for five years before being promoted to assistant coach in the 2001–02 season.

Philadelphia 76ers (2004–2005) 
After coaching with Boston, Vogel went on to become an assistant for the Philadelphia 76ers. Vogel left the 76ers to become an advance scout for the Los Angeles Lakers from 2005 to 2006 and the Washington Wizards from 2006 to 2007.

Indiana Pacers (2007–2016) 
Vogel became an assistant for the Indiana Pacers in 2007 under former Celtics colleague Jim O'Brien.

On January 30, 2011, after O'Brien was fired from his head coaching position, Vogel was named interim coach. As interim coach, Vogel led the Pacers to the playoffs for the first time since 2006. Vogel was officially named as the Pacers' head coach on July 6, 2011.

Shortly before the Indiana Pacers were to take on the Miami Heat in the 2012 Eastern Conference semifinals, Vogel criticized his opponents for alleged flopping: "They are the biggest flopping team in the NBA. It'll be very interesting (to see) how the referees officiate the series and how much flopping they reward... Every drive to the basket, they have guys not making a play on the ball, but sliding in front of drivers. Often times they're falling down even before contact is even being made. It'll be interesting to see how the series is officiated." He was fined $15,000 by the league for these remarks.

On April 7, 2013, the Pacers clinched their first Central Division title since the 2003–04 season. They finished the 2012–13 season with a 49–32 record, clinching the third seed in the Eastern Conference. After defeating both the Atlanta Hawks and the New York Knicks in six games, the Pacers went on to face the Miami Heat in the Eastern Conference Finals. In Game 1, the Pacers were defeated by the Heat 103–102 in overtime after LeBron James drove by Paul George for a wide-open layup with 2.2 seconds left on the clock. Vogel was roundly criticized for leaving the Pacers' primary defender, Roy Hibbert, on the bench during the final play. Vogel said that he made that decision out of concern of Chris Bosh and acknowledged that he might do it differently next time. In a back-and-forth series where neither team won consecutive games, the Pacers lost in seven games.

On January 14, 2014, Vogel was named the Eastern Conference head coach for the 2014 NBA All-Star Game. He had guided the team to their best start in franchise history, en route to a 56–26 record, good for first in the Eastern Conference. However, for the second consecutive year, the Pacers lost to the Miami Heat in the Conference Finals.

Vogel signed a two-year contract extension with the Indiana Pacers, to keep him through 2016. With Paul George missing all but six games of the season due to injury, the Pacers just missed the playoffs due to tiebreakers with the Brooklyn Nets. Vogel brought the team back to the playoffs with a retooled and rejuvenated roster the following season, however they fell to the Toronto Raptors in seven games in the first round.

On May 5, 2016, following the loss to the Raptors, Pacers' president Larry Bird announced that Vogel's contract would not be renewed, citing a need for "a new voice" to lead the players. He departed Indiana as the franchise's all-time leader in NBA wins (Bobby "Slick" Leonard has the most total victories as the Pacers' head coach, with the majority coming in the ABA).

Orlando Magic (2016–2018)
On May 20, 2016, Vogel was named the head coach of the Orlando Magic. He oversaw a young, developing team and dealt with a change in the front office after his first year when Rob Hennigan, the general manager who hired him, was replaced with John Hammond. He went 54–110, missing the playoffs both seasons. On April 12, 2018, Vogel was fired by the Magic after the conclusion of the 2017–18 season.

Los Angeles Lakers (2019–2022)
On May 13, 2019, Vogel was named the head coach of the Los Angeles Lakers. In his first season in 2019–20, the Lakers developed into one of the league's top defensive teams. He led the team to a 52–19 record and an NBA championship, having the best record in the Western Conference and third-best record in the league. Vogel was named a head coach of 2020 NBA All-Star Game due to the Lakers holding the best record in the West. In the playoffs, the Lakers defeated the Portland Trail Blazers, Houston Rockets, and Denver Nuggets in five games each. In the 2020 NBA Finals, they beat the Miami Heat in six games to claim the 17th NBA title in Lakers' history, tying Boston for the most championships. The team spent over 100 days in the NBA bubble after the season resumed from its four-month suspension due to the COVID-19 pandemic.

In his second season, the Lakers finished with a 42–30 record as Anthony Davis and LeBron James sustained injuries throughout the season. Training camp began 71 days after the end of the NBA Finals, the shortest NBA offseason ever. The Lakers were 21–6 when Davis injured his Achilles, which sidelined him for 30 games. They advanced from the play-in tournament and made the playoffs as the No. 7 seed, but were eliminated in the first round by the eventual Western Conference champion Phoenix Suns in six games. 

After trading for Russell Westbrook, the Lakers entered the 2021–22 season as the favorites to win the conference. Vogel used 41 different starting lineups, as James and Davis again missed significant time to injuries. The Lakers finished 11th in the Western Conference with a 33–49 record and missed the playoffs. On April 11, 2022, Vogel was fired by the Lakers. He went 127–98 in three seasons.

Head coaching record

|-
| style="text-align:left;"|Indiana
| style="text-align:left;"|
| 38||20||18||.526|| style="text-align:center;"|2nd in Central||5||1||4||
| style="text-align:center;"|Lost in First Round
|-
| style="text-align:left;"|Indiana
| style="text-align:left;"|
| 66||42||24|||| style="text-align:center;"|2nd in Central||11||6||5||
| style="text-align:center;"|Lost in Conference Semifinals
|-
| style="text-align:left;"|Indiana
| style="text-align:left;"|
| 81||49||32|||| style="text-align:center;"|1st in Central||19||11||8||
| style="text-align:center;"|Lost in Conference Finals
|-
| style="text-align:left;"|Indiana
| style="text-align:left;"|
| 82||56||26|||| style="text-align:center;"|1st in Central||19||10||9||
| style="text-align:center;"|Lost in Conference Finals
|-
| style="text-align:left;"|Indiana
| style="text-align:left;"|
| 82||38||44|||| style="text-align:center;"|3rd in Central||—||—||—||—
| style="text-align:center;"|Missed playoffs
|-
| style="text-align:left;"|Indiana
| style="text-align:left;"|
| 82||45||37|||| style="text-align:center;"|2nd in Central||7||3||4||
| style="text-align:center;"|Lost in First Round
|-
| style="text-align:left;"|Orlando
| style="text-align:left;"|
| 82||29||53|||| style="text-align:center;"|5th in Southeast||—||—||—||—
| style="text-align:center;"|Missed playoffs
|-
| style="text-align:left;"|Orlando
| style="text-align:left;"|
| 82||25||57|||| style="text-align:center;"|4th in Southeast||—||—||—||—|| style="text-align:center;"|Missed playoffs
|-
|- ! style="background:#FDE910;"
| style="text-align:left;"|L.A. Lakers
| style="text-align:left;"|
| 71||52||19|||| style="text-align:center;"|1st in Pacific||21||16||5||
| style="text-align:center;"| Won NBA championship
|-
| style="text-align:left;"|L.A. Lakers
| style="text-align:left;"|
| 72||42||30|||| style="text-align:center;"|3rd in Pacific||6||2||4||
| style="text-align:center;"|Lost in First Round
|- 
| style="text-align:left;"|L.A. Lakers
| style="text-align:left;"|
| 82||33||49|||| style="text-align:center;"|4th in Pacific||—||—||—||—|| style="text-align:center;"|Missed playoffs
|- class="sortbottom"
| style="text-align:center;" colspan="2"|Career||814||431||389|||| ||88||49||39||||

Personal life
Vogel married his wife Jenifer in 2002. They have two daughters.

References

1973 births
American men's basketball players
Basketball coaches from New Jersey
Basketball players from New Jersey
Boston Celtics assistant coaches
Indiana Pacers assistant coaches
Indiana Pacers head coaches
Juniata Eagles men's basketball players
Living people
Los Angeles Lakers head coaches
National Basketball Association championship-winning head coaches
Orlando Magic head coaches
People from Wildwood Crest, New Jersey
Philadelphia 76ers assistant coaches
Sportspeople from Cape May County, New Jersey
University of Kentucky alumni